W7 may refer to:
 Eutelsat W7, a communications satellite
 JL Audio W7, a popular model of subwoofer
 London Buses route W7, a London bus route
 W7, a postcode district in the W postcode area
 Mark 7 nuclear bomb, a tactical nuclear bomb adopted by US armed forces
 Windows 7, an operating system
 US Form W-7, used to obtain an Individual Taxpayer Identification Number
 W7, an object-capability subset of the Scheme programming language developed by Jonathan Rees
 W7 series, a high-speed shinkansen train type in Japan
 An abbreviation for Warner Bros.-Seven Arts, the name of an entertainment company
 W7, a calmodulin antagonist, an inhibitor of Ca2+/calmodulin-dependent protein kinase; N-(6-aminohexyl)-5-chloro-1-naphthalenesulfonamide hydrochloride
 W-7 Class minesweeper, or the minesweeper itself, W-7
 W7 (tram), a class of electric trams built by the Melbourne & Metropolitan Tramways Board.

References